Women & Film, published in California between 1972 and 1975, was the first feminist film magazine, "a project that would transform cinema".

Women & Film was coedited by Siew-Hwa Beh, a Malaysian immigrant to the United States studying filmmaking at UCLA, and Saunie Salyer, who was involved in a local women's collective. It was originally planned as a special issue of the collective's magazine, Every Woman. The opening editorial announced a thorough-going socialist-feminist critique of the U.S. film industry:

Within days all 600 copies of the first issue sold out. The magazine, which did not take advertisement, eventually closed facing financial and organizational problems.

References

External links
 Women and Film archive
 FWSE Blog - Women and Film Project

1972 establishments in California
1975 disestablishments in California
Film magazines published in the United States
Defunct women's magazines published in the United States
Feminism in the United States
Feminist magazines
Magazines established in 1972
Magazines disestablished in 1975
Magazines published in California
Women's film organizations